"Inside Outside" is the fifth track on the album World Service by Delirious?. On 8 March 2004, "Inside Outside" was released to the German singles market. It reached #72 in its first week and stayed in the top 100 for six more, an unprecedented achievement for a Christian song. This was arguably the breakthrough for Delirious? in Germany.

Track listing
"Inside Outside" (Audiostar Radio Mix)
"Inside Outside" (British Short Version)
"Inside Outside" (Original Album Version)
"Grace Like A River"
"It’s OK"

Chart performance

2004 singles
Delirious? songs
2003 songs
Songs written by Stu G
Songs written by Martin Smith (English musician)